In historical linguistics, cognates or lexical cognates are sets of words in different languages that have been inherited in direct descent from an etymological ancestor in a common parent language. Because language change can have radical effects on both the sound and the meaning of a word, cognates may not be obvious, and often it takes rigorous study of historical sources and the application of the comparative method to establish whether lexemes are cognate. Cognates are distinguished from loanwords, where a word has been borrowed from another language.

The term cognate derives from the Latin noun cognatus 'blood relative'.

Characteristics
Cognates need not have the same meaning, which may have changed as the languages developed independently. For example English starve and Dutch sterven 'to die' or German sterben 'to die' all descend from the same Proto-Germanic verb, *sterbaną 'to die'.

Cognates also do not need to look or sound similar: English father, French père, and Armenian հայր (hayr) all descend directly from Proto-Indo-European *ph₂tḗr. An extreme case is Armenian երկու (erku) and English two, which descend from Proto-Indo-European *dwóh₁; the sound change *dw > erk in Armenian is regular.

An example of cognates from the same Indo-European root are: night (English), nicht (Scots), Nacht (German), nacht (Dutch, Frisian), nag (Afrikaans), Naach (Colognian), natt (Swedish, Norwegian), nat (Danish), nátt (Faroese), nótt (Icelandic), noc (Czech, Slovak, Polish), ночь, noch (Russian), ноќ, noć (Macedonian), нощ, nosht (Bulgarian), ніч, nich (Ukrainian), ноч, noch/noč (Belarusian), noč (Slovene), noć (Serbo-Croatian), nakts (Latvian), naktis (Lithuanian), νύξ, nyx (Ancient Greek), νύχτα / nychta (Modern Greek), nakt- (Sanskrit), natë (Albanian), nox, gen. sg. noctis (Latin), nuit (French), noche (Spanish), nueche (Asturian), noite (Portuguese and Galician), notte (Italian), nit (Catalan), nuet/nit/nueit (Aragonese), nuèch / nuèit (Occitan) and noapte (Romanian). These all mean 'night' and derive from the Proto-Indo-European  'night'. The Indo-European languages have hundreds of such cognate sets, though few of them are as neat as this.

The Arabic  salām, the Hebrew  shalom, the Assyrian Neo-Aramaic shlama and the Amharic selam 'peace' are cognates, derived from the Proto-Semitic *šalām- 'peace'.

False cognates

False cognates are pairs of words that appear to have a common origin, but which in fact do not. For example, Latin  and German  both mean 'to have' and are phonetically similar. However, the words evolved from different Proto-Indo-European (PIE) roots:  , like English have, comes from PIE *kh₂pyé- 'to grasp', and has the Latin cognate capere 'to seize, grasp, capture'. , on the other hand, is from PIE *gʰabʰ 'to give, to receive', and hence cognate with English give and German .

A true cognate of much is the archaic Spanish  'big'.

Distinctions
Cognates are distinguished from other kinds of relationships.
Loanwords are words borrowed from one language into another, for example English beef is borrowed from Old French boef (meaning "ox"). Although they are part of a single etymological stemma, they are not cognates.
Doublets are pairs of words in the same language which are derived from a single etymon, which may have similar but distinct meanings and uses. Often one is a loanword and the other is the native form, or they have developed in different dialects and then found themselves together in a modern standard language. For example, Old French boef is cognate with English cow, so English cow and beef are doublets. 
Translations, or semantic equivalents, are words in two different languages that have similar meanings. They may be cognate, but usually they are not. For example, the German equivalent of the English word cow is Kuh, which is also cognate, but the French equivalent is vache, which is unrelated.

Related terms
The etymon, or ancestor word, is the ultimate source word whence one or more cognates derive. For example, the etymon of both Welsh ceffyl and Irish capall would be the Proto-Celtic *kaballos (all meaning horse). Outside of historical linguistics, a parallel term for an etymon is a root or root word. In this usage however, the analysis is limited to within a single language rather than across separate languages. Run, as such, can be said to be the root of both running and runs, while happy would be the root word of such others as unhappiness or happily.
A derivative is any word coming from a particular etymon. Similar to the distinction between etymon and root above, a nuanced distinction can sometimes be made between a derivative and a descendant. Descendant can be used more narrowly within the context of historical linguistics to emphasize a word inherited across a language barrier. For example, Russian мо́ре and Polish morze are both descendants of Proto-Slavic *moře. By contrast, within the study of morphological derivation, unhappy, happily, and unhappily are all derivatives of the word happy.

See also

Homology (biology)
Indo-European vocabulary

References

External links

Historical linguistics
Comparative linguistics